Talmont is a surname. Notable people with the surname include:

Konrad Talmont-Kamiński (born 1971), Polish-Australian philosopher
Pierre Talmont (born 1977), French footballer
Ralph Talmont (born 1963), Australian/Polish photographer, multimedia producer and entrepreneur
, Lithuanian politician of Polish extraction, member of parliament

See also